Joseph Daniel Bolden (born August 19, 1993) is an American football coach and former player. He is currently the special teams coordinator and outside linebackers coach for the Nevada Wolf Pack. Bolden is a former player for the Michigan Wolverines football team.

High school career
Bolden was born in 1993 and raised in Cincinnati, Ohio, attending Colerain High School.  He verbally committed to the University of Michigan in April 2011.  He was selected as a first-team All-Ohio player in 2011 and played in the 2012 Under Armour All-America Game.

College career
As a freshman during the 2012 season, Bolden appeared in 13 games on special teams and 12 games as a backup at the linebacker position.  At the end of the season, he was named to the All-Big Ten Conference freshman teams selected by ESPN.com and BTN.com.  As a sophomore in 2013, Bolden appeared in 13 games as a linebacker and was a starter in four games.

During the 2014 season, Bolden was Michigan's second leading tackler with 102 tackles, including 55 solo tackles.

In April 2015, Bolden was placed on the watch list for the Lott IMPACT Trophy. He was selected as a co-captain of the 2015 Michigan team.  During the 2015 season, Bolden led Michigan with 83 total tackles.

NFL career
Bolden went undrafted in the 2016 NFL Draft. Bolden subsequently tried out with the Washington Redskins during rookie mini-camp.

Coaching career

Early Coaching
Following his playing career, Bolden was a graduate assistant for one year at Michigan in 2016 before a brief stop at Florida Atlantic and then on to Washington State for the 2017 and 2018 seasons. In 2019, he served as the special teams quality control analyst at USC.

In 2020, Bolden joined Ohio State coaching staff as a quality control coach on defense.

Nevada
In January 2022, Bolden got his first full-time coaching position when he was hired as part of Ken Wilson's inaugural Nevada Wolf Pack staff. He will serve as the special teams coordinator, while also coaching the outside linebackers.

References

External links
 Washington State profile

1993 births
Living people
American football linebackers
Michigan Wolverines football players
Washington State Cougars football coaches
Players of American football from Cincinnati